Shib Narayan Das (born 16 December 1946) is the first craftsman of the first national flag of Bangladesh.

Designing the national flag of Bangladesh
As desired by the then NUCLEUS (Shadhin Bangla Biplobi Parishad) by a match stick and yellow colored paint, he marked the map of Bangladesh over the red circle of the proposed flag  in the room numbered 108 of the  then Iqbal Hall of Dhaka University (DU) from deep mid-night of June 6 up to the dawn of June 7 in 1970. A. S. M. Abdur Rab, Shahjahan Siraj, Kazi Aref Ahmed, Manirul Islam, Swapan Kumar Choudhury, Quamrul Alam Khan (Khasru), Hasanul Haq Inu, Yousuf Salahuddin Ahmed and  some others were also involved in it and present at that time .

On behalf of the NUCLEUS, the same flag was unfurled by Abdur Rab along with AFM Mahbubul Haq, Das and other student league leaders from the roof top of the western porch of the Arts Faculty of DU, on March 2, 1971, shortly before the outbreak of the Bangladesh Liberation War.

After the independence of Bangladesh in 1971, the map of Bangladesh was removed from the flag as it had difficulty for rendering the map correctly on both sides of the flag. Artist Quamrul Hassan was asked to report on the design, color, shape and explanation. On 17 January 1972, the new design was made the official national flag of Bangladesh.

References

People from Comilla District
Bangladesh Liberation War
Living people
Flag designers
People from Comilla
1946 births
Bengali Hindus
Bangladeshi Hindus
Comilla Victoria Government College alumni